Hugh O’Reilly (1724–1801) was an Irish Catholic bishop.

Biography
O’Reilly was appointed the Coadjutor Bishop of the Diocese of Clogher in Ireland on 27 April 1777. He was ordained a bishop on 29 July of that same year.  He became Roman Catholic Bishop of Clogher on 28 March 1778, following the death of his predecessor, Daniel O'Reilly.  Ordained a bishop at the age of 38, Hugh O’Reilly was the youngest bishop of the diocese in modern times.  He died in office in on 3 September 1801 having served as bishop of his diocese for almost twenty-four years.  O’Reilly was succeeded by Bishop James Murphy, who had was appointed his Coadjutor Bishop in May 1798. He is buried in the old Magheross graveyard in Carrickmacross.

See also
Roman Catholic Diocese of Clogher

References

Roman Catholic bishops of Clogher
1739 births
1801 deaths
People from County Cavan
18th-century Roman Catholic bishops in Ireland